Belfield–Emporia Historic District, also known as North Emporia, is a national historic district located at Emporia, Virginia. The district includes 41 contributing buildings in the Belfield section of Emporia. In 1887, the neighboring towns of Hicksford and Belfield merged to form the town of Emporia. The district generally consists of late-19th- to early-20th-century brick buildings laid out in a "T"-shape at the intersection of Halifax and Baker Streets. Notable buildings include the Hotel Virginia, the Bethlehem Building or former First National Bank of Emporia (1907), Petersburg and Danville Railroad passenger station, and Pair's Furniture (c. 1904).  Located in the district is the separately listed H. T. Klugel Architectural Sheet Metal Work Building.

It was listed on the National Register of Historic Places in 2007.

Gallery

References

National Register of Historic Places in Emporia, Virginia
Italianate architecture in Virginia
Historic districts on the National Register of Historic Places in Virginia
Buildings and structures in Emporia, Virginia